Quiet Night Thought is a famous poem written by the Tang Dynasty poet, Li Bai (also known as Li Bo or Li Po).

Text
The text below is a Qing-dynasty version, with Mandarin pronunciation. It is taught to children in both Taiwanese and Chinese schools.

Variants

There are other versions of this poem that replace "the bright moonlight" with "I see the moonlight" and/or "gazing at the bright moon" with "gazing at the mountain and the moon". The insertion of the character  (míng "light/bright") into poetry was common practice during the Ming dynasty, whose Chinese name features this character. For a 17th-century edition of the poem, see the example, with notes, in "Rare Book Preservation Society#Li Bai Tang poem".

Background and evaluation
Li drew inspiration for the poem through personal experiences as a Confucian scholar detached from his hometown. In the times of Imperial China, scholars and artisans affiliated with the court were often detached from their hometowns for extended periods of times as part of their duties and loyalties as courtiers or worthy subjects to the Emperor of China. While it was expected in traditional Confucian ritual to remain a loyal subject to the Emperor and abide by the Emperor's wishes, filial piety also formed one of the foundations of Confucian thought, and emphasised upon the importance of embracing and honouring one's ancestry and roots. However, the Emperor was also considered the "Father" of all his subjects, and so his courtiers were also required to express their filial duties to the Emperor. Through the poem, Li Bai fulfils responsibilities of filial piety to both Emperor and his ascendants as he expresses his yearning for his hometown, in accordance with Confucian values, as well as obedience towards the sad obligation of remaining loyal to imperial edict, again in accordance to Confucian values of filial piety. Indeed, the poem alludes to the August moon and therefore the Mid-Autumn Festival. The Mid-Autumn Festival serves as a highly important festival in Chinese culture for its adherence to Chinese family values, and is traditionally associated with family reunion. Li is therefore lamenting over the impossibility of family reunion due to  the importance of the imperial edict, yet stresses the importance of valuing one's origin even amidst the impossibility of reunion.

The poem is one of Li's shi poems, structured as a single quatrain in five-character regulated verse with a simple AABA rhyme scheme (at least in its original Middle Chinese dialect as well as the majority of contemporary Chinese dialects). It is short and direct in accordance with the guidelines for shi poetry, and cannot be conceived as purely a personal poem, but as a poem relatable to all those detached from their hometowns out of obligation. Hence, in contrast to Li Bai's longer, more free-form gushi, "Quiet Night Thought" is vague, yet expresses solemnity and yearning through a combination of its night-time imagery and its spare form.

Legacy
Since its conception during the Tang Dynasty, "Quiet Night Thought" remains one of Li Bai's most famous and memorable poems. It is featured in classic Chinese poetry anthologies such as the Three Hundred Tang Poems and is popularly taught in Chinese-language schools as part of Chinese literature curricula. It is also commonly taught as one of the earliest works of Chinese poetry in the education of juniors for its relative simplicity and straightforward yet effective use of imagery to provoke basic Confucian values.

See also
 Li Bai
 Tang poetry

References

Tang dynasty poetry
Chinese poems
Li Bai